Ivanovsky (feminine: Ivanovskaya) is a Russian surname. It may refer to:

Dmitri Ivanovsky (1864–1920), Russian biologist
Lyubov Ivanovskaya (born 1989), professional Russian triathlete
Oleg Ivanovsky (1922–2014), Soviet spacecraft designer
Roman Ivanovsky (born 1977), Russian breaststroke swimmer
Viacheslav Ivanovsky (born 1975), Israeli Olympic weightlifter

See also
Ivanovski (feminine: Ivanovska), Macedonian surname
Ivanauskas, Lithuanian form
Iwanowski, Polish form

Russian-language surnames